Mariotte may refer to:

People
 Antoine Mariotte (1875–1944), French composer
 Edme Mariotte (c. 1620–1684), French physicist and priest
 Jeff Mariotte (born 1955), American author

Other
 Mariotte (crater), a lunar crater
 French submarine Mariotte

See also
 Marriott (disambiguation)